Hypopyra is a genus of moths in the family Erebidae.

Species
Hypopyra africana (Kirby, 1896)
Hypopyra allardi (Oberthür, 1878) (syn: Hypopyra leucochiton (Mabille, 1884))
Hypopyra burmanica (Hampson, 1913)
Hypopyra capensis Herrich-Schäffer, 1854
Hypopyra carneotincta (Hampson, 1913)
Hypopyra configurans Walker, 1858
Hypopyra contractipennis (de Joannis, 1912)
Hypopyra feniseca Guenée, 1852
Hypopyra guttata Wallengren, 1856
Hypopyra lactipex (Hampson, 1913)
Hypopyra malgassica Mabille, 1878
Hypopyra megalesia Mabille, 1879 (syn: Hypopyra bosei Saalmüller, 1880)
Hypopyra meridionalis (Hampson, 1913)
Hypopyra ochracea (Candeze, 1927)
Hypopyra ossigera Guenée, 1852
Hypopyra ossigeroides Holloway, 2005
Hypopyra padanga (Swinhoe, 1918)
Hypopyra pallidigera Holloway, 2005
Hypopyra pudens Walker, 1858 (syn: Hypopyra grandaeva Felder and Rogenhofer, 1874, Hypopyra persimilis Moore, 1877)
Hypopyra rufescens (Kirby, 1896)
Hypopyra spermatophora (Hampson, 1913)
Hypopyra unistrigata Guenée, 1852 (syn: Hypopyra idonea (Walker, 1865), Hypopyra poeusaria (Walker, 1860))
Hypopyra vespertilio (Fabricius, 1787) (syn: Hypopyra distans Moore, 1882, Hypopyra dulcina Felder and Rogenhofer, 1874, Hypopyra extricans Walker, 1858, Hypopyra hypopyroides (Walker, 1858), Hypopyra hypopyroides (Walker, 1869), Hypopyra pallida Moore, 1883, Hypopyra pandia Felder and Rogenhofer, 1874, Hypopyra shiva Guenée, 1852, Hypopyra signata Walker, 1869)
Hypopyra villicosta (L.B. Prout, 1919)

References

External links

 
Hypopyrini
Moth genera